Trapella is a genus of flowering plants belonging to the family Plantaginaceae.

Its native range is Temperate Asia.

Species:
 Trapella sinensis Oliv.

References

Plantaginaceae
Plantaginaceae genera